The Karaganda railway station is located in the city of Karaganda that is owned and operated by the Kazakhstan Temir Zholy. The railway station consists of two waiting rooms for passengers, lounges and a room for a mother and child, contact points and telephone stations, an information desk, and railway ticket sales points. The station annually serves an average of about 1.5 million passengers.

History 
Karaganda became a major railway transport hub in 1950, when the Trans-Siberian and Turkestan-Siberia Railway were connected and at the same time, the development of Virgin Lands campaign began, which resulted in the need of the development of a transport and passenger railway infrastructure.

The railway station was built in 1956. The building project was developed by the Lengiprotrans Institute. The architects of the project were P. Ashastin and M. Beniolinson. The foyer and waiting rooms are decorated with bas-reliefs of the Karaganda sculptor Petr Antonenko. The total area of the railway station is 2,400 sq. meters.

In 1969, a bus station was built next to the railway station which a large urban transport hub was formed.

In 2018, the reconstruction of the railway passenger terminal began. It provides for the construction of a new two-story building to serve passengers, while the area and capacity of the complex will almost double. The next stage should be the reconstruction of the historic building while preserving the 1950's style architectural elements. It is planned that the new building will be built in the same architectural style as the old one.

On 26 March 2019, the railway station building was temporarily closed for reconstruction. During that period, passengers were served in the building of the bus station and on the platform.

References 

Buildings and structures in Karaganda
Railway stations in Karaganda Region
Railway stations opened in 1956
Transport in Karaganda